Lulaman Rural District or Luleman Rural District may refer to:
 Lulaman Rural District (Fuman County)
 Luleman Rural District (Rasht County)